Renaissance Technologies LLC, also known as RenTech or RenTec, is an American hedge fund based in East Setauket, New York, on Long Island, which specializes in systematic trading using quantitative models derived from mathematical and statistical analysis. Their signature Medallion fund is famed for the best record in investing history. Renaissance was founded in 1982 by James Simons, a mathematician who formerly worked as a code breaker during the Cold War. 

In 1988, the firm established its most profitable portfolio, the Medallion Fund, which used an improved and expanded form of Leonard Baum's mathematical models, improved by algebraist James Ax, to explore correlations from which they could profit. Elwyn Berlekamp was instrumental in evolving trading to shorter-dated, pure systems driven decision-making. The hedge fund was named Medallion in honor of the math awards that Simons and Ax had won.

Renaissance's flagship Medallion fund, which is run mostly for fund employees, is famed for the best track record on Wall Street, returning more than 66 percent annualized before fees and 39 percent after fees over a 30-year span from 1988 to 2018. Renaissance offers two portfolios to outside investors—Renaissance Institutional Equities Fund (RIEF) and Renaissance Institutional Diversified Alpha (RIDA).

Because of the success of Renaissance in general and Medallion in particular, Simons has been described as the "best money manager on earth".

Simons ran Renaissance until his retirement in late 2009. He continued to play a role at the firm as non-executive chairman, which he stepped down from in 2021, and remains invested in its funds, particularly the Medallion fund. The company is now run by Peter Brown (after Robert Mercer resigned). Both of them were computer scientists specializing in computational linguistics who joined Renaissance in 1993 from IBM Research. The fund has $165 billion in discretionary assets under management (including leverage) as of April 2021.

Academia and research

James Simons founded Renaissance Technologies following a decade as the Chair of the Department of Mathematics at Stony Brook University. Simons in 1976 was a recipient of the Oswald Veblen Prize of the American Mathematical Society, which is geometry's highest honor. He is known in the scientific community for co-developing the Chern–Simons theory, which is used in modern theoretical physics.

Quantitative trading

The firm uses quantitative trading, where staff tap data in its petabyte-scale data warehouse to assess statistical probabilities for the direction of securities prices in any given market. Staff attribute the breadth of data on events peripheral to financial and economic phenomena that Renaissance takes into account, and the firm's ability to manipulate large amounts of data by deploying scalable technological architectures for computation and execution. In many ways, Renaissance Technologies, along with a few other firms, has been synthesizing terabytes of data daily and extracting information signals from petabytes of data for almost two decades now, well before big data and data analytics caught the imagination of mainstream technology.

For more than twenty years, the firm's Renaissance Technologies hedge fund has employed mathematical models to analyze and execute trades, many of them automated. The firm uses computer-based models to predict price changes in easily traded financial instruments. These models are based on analyzing as much data as can be gathered, then looking for non-random movements to make predictions. Some also attribute the firm's performance to employing financial signal processing techniques such as pattern recognition. The book The Quants describes the hiring of speech recognition experts, many from IBM, including the current leaders of the firm.

"Quants" with non-financial background
Renaissance employs specialists with non-financial backgrounds, including computer scientists, mathematicians, physicists, signal processing experts and statisticians. The firm's latest fund is the Renaissance Institutional Equities Fund (RIEF). RIEF has historically trailed the firm's better-known Medallion fund, a separate fund that contains only the personal money of the firm's executives.

In a 2013 article in The Daily Telegraph, journalist Sarfraz Manzoor described Renaissance staff as math geniuses running Wall Street.

Renaissance is a firm run by and for scientists, employing preferably those with non-financial backgrounds for quantitative finance research like mathematicians, statisticians, theoretical and experimental physicists, astronomers, and computer scientists. Wall Street experience is frowned on and a flair for science is prized. It is a widely held belief within Renaissance that the herdlike mentality among business school graduates is to blame for poor investor returns. Renaissance engages roughly 150 researchers and computer programmers, half of whom have PhDs in scientific disciplines, at its 50-acre East Setauket campus in Long Island, New York, which is near the State University of New York at Stony Brook. Mathematician Isadore Singer referred to Renaissance's East Setauket office as the best physics and mathematics department in the world.

The firm's administrative and back-office functions are handled from its Manhattan office in New York City. The firm is secretive about the workings of its business and very little is known about them. The firm is known for its ability to recruit and retain scientific types, for having a personnel turnover that is nearly non-existent, and for requiring its researchers to agree to intellectual property obligations by signing non-compete and non-disclosure agreements.

Monemetrics 

In 1978, Simons left academia and started a hedge fund management firm called Monemetrics in a Long Island strip mall. The firm primarily traded currencies at the start. It did not occur to Simons at first to apply mathematics to his business, but he gradually realized that it should be possible to make mathematical models of the data he was collecting.

Monemetrics’ name was changed to Renaissance Technologies in 1982. Simons started recruiting some of the mathematicians and data-modeling types from his days at the Institute for Defense Analysis (IDA) and Stony Brook University. His first recruit was Leonard Baum, a cryptanalyst from IDA who was also the co-author of the Baum–Welch algorithm. When Baum abandoned the idea of trading with mathematical models and took to fundamental trading, Simons brought in algebraist James Ax from Cornell University. Ax expanded Baum's models for trading currencies to cover any commodity future and subsequently Simons set up Ax with his own trading account, Axcom Ltd., which eventually gave birth to the profitable fund — Medallion. During the 1980s, Ax and his researchers improved on Baum's models and used them to explore correlations from which they could profit.

Medallion Fund

In 1988, Renaissance established its most profitable fund, the Medallion fund (previously the Limroy Colombian fund), which used an expanded form of Leonard Baum's mathematical models improved by algebraist James Ax to explore correlations from which they could profit. Simons and Ax, who were classmates at the Berkeley, started Medallion, which they named after their awards in mathematics. The initial success of the company's models led Simons to base the fund's trades entirely on the models.

By April 1989, however, peak-to-trough losses had mounted to about 30%. Ax claimed to have accounted for such a decline in his models and insisted on continuing to trade. Simons wanted to pause and reevaluate; Simons, as majority owner, prevailed, and Ax departed. Simons then asked Berkeley professor Elwyn Berlekamp to run Medallion. A consultant for Axcom whom Simons had first met at the IDA, Berlekamp had acquired most of Ax's stake in Axcom and became its CEO. He worked with Sandor Straus, Jim Simons and another consultant, Henry Laufer, to overhaul Medallion's trading system over the course of six months. In 1990, Berlekamp led Medallion to a 55.9% gain, net of fees, and then returned to his duties as a Berkeley professor after selling out to Simons at six times the price for which he had bought his Axcom interests sixteen months earlier. Straus then took Berlekamp's place, running Medallion's revamped trading system, which returned 39.4% in 1991, 34% in 1992 and 39.1% in 1993, according to Medallion annual reports.

The Medallion fund is considered to be one of the most successful hedge funds ever. From 1994 through mid-2014, it averaged a 71.8% annual return, before fees. The fund has been closed to outside investors since 1993 and is available only to current and past employees and their families. The firm bought out the last investor in the Medallion fund in 2005 and the investor community has not seen its returns since then. About 100 of Renaissance's some 275 employees are "qualified purchasers", meaning they generally have at least $5 million in assets to invest. The remaining are "accredited investors", generally worth at least $1 million.

By 2000, the computer-driven Medallion fund had an average annual return of 34% after fees from its 1988 inception. Simons ran Renaissance until his retirement in late 2009. Between January 1993 and April 2005, Medallion only had 17 losing months and out of 49 quarters over the same period, Medallion had only three losing quarters. Between 1989-2005 Medallion had only one year showing a loss: 1989.

During 2020 the Medallion fund surged 76%.

Medallion as a retirement fund

Renaissance Technologies terminated its 401(k) retirement plan in 2010 and employees' account balances were put into Individual Retirement Accounts. Contributions could be made to a standard Individual Retirement Accounts and then converted to a Roth IRA regardless of income. By 2012, Renaissance was granted a special exemption by the United States Labor Department allowing employees to invest their retirement money in Medallion arguing that Medallion had consistently outperformed their old 401(k) plan. In 2013, Renaissance's IRA plans had 259 participants whose $86.6 million contribution grew to $153 million that year without fees or annual taxes. Renaissance set up a new 401(k) plan, and in November 2014 the Labor Department allowed that plan to be invested in Medallion as well.

Renaissance Institutional Equities Fund (RIEF)

In 2005, Renaissance Institutional Equities Fund (RIEF) was created. RIEF has historically trailed the firm's better-known Medallion fund, a separate fund that only contains the personal money of the firm's executives. In April 2020, Institutional Investor reported that the disparity between Renaissance's Medallion fund and other funds, including RIEF, was approximately 17-19%. Renaissance also offers two Renaissance Institutional Diversified Alpha (RIDA) to outsiders. Simons ran Renaissance until his retirement in late 2009. Renaissance Institutional Equities Fund had difficulty with the higher volatility environment that persisted throughout the end of the summer of 2007. According to an article in Bloomberg in August 2007,

RIEF once again struggled in the high volatility environment of 2020. According to an article in Bloomberg in November 2020,

From December 1st 2020 to February 1st 2021, according to Bloomberg, clients (LPs) had withdrawn $5 billion from the fund.

On 25 September 2008, Renaissance wrote a comment letter to the Securities and Exchange Commission, discouraging them from implementing a rule change that would have permitted the public to access information regarding institutional investors' short positions, as they can currently do with long positions. The company cited a number of reasons for this, including the fact that "institutional investors may alter their trading activity to avoid public disclosure".

Governmental affairs

2014 tax avoidance investigation
In July 2014, Renaissance Technologies was included in a larger investigation undertaken by Carl Levin and the Permanent Subcommittee on Investigations on tax evasion by wealthy individuals. The focus of the tax avoidance investigation was Renaissance's trading strategy — which involved transactions with banks such as Barclays Plc and Deutsche Bank AG — through which profits converted from rapid trading were converted into lower-taxed, long-term capital gains. The strategy was also questioned by the Internal Revenue Service (IRS). The higher rates for the five years under investigation would have been 44.4 percent, as compared to 35 percent, whereas the lower rate was 15 percent, as compared to 23.8 percent.

In September 2021, Simons, Mercer, and other Renaissance executives agreed to pay up to $7 billion in taxes and penalties to settle the dispute with the Internal Revenue Service. The settlement was among the largest in history.

Campaign contributions
According to OpenSecrets, Renaissance is the top financial firm contributing to federal campaigns in the 2016 election cycle, donating $33,108,000 by July.  By comparison, over that same period sixth ranked Soros Fund Management has contributed $13,238,551.  Renaissance's managers were also active in the 2016 cycle, contributing nearly $30 million by June, with Mercer ranking as the #1 individual federal donor, largely to Republicans, and Simons ranked #5, largely to Democrats. They were top donors to the presidential campaigns of Hillary Clinton and Donald Trump.

During the 2016 campaign cycle, Simons contributed $26,277,450, ranking as the 5th largest individual contributor. Simons directed all but $25,000 of his funds towards liberal candidates. Robert Mercer contributed $25,059,300, ranking as the 7th largest individual contributor. Robert Mercer directed all funds contributed towards conservative candidates.

Between 1990 and 2016, Renaissance has contributed $59,081,152 to federal campaigns and since 2001 has spent $3,730,000 on lobbying.

See also
 High-frequency trading
 Quote stuffing
 Winton Group
 D. E. Shaw & Co.
 PDT Partners
 Two Sigma Investments
 Flash Boys
 Dark liquidity
 Algorithmic trading

References

Financial services companies established in 1982
Hedge fund firms in New York City
Hedge funds
Companies based in Suffolk County, New York
Investment management companies of the United States